Stop Six is a neighborhood in south-east Fort Worth, Texas (USA).

Stop Six, a mostly African-American neighborhood, is known for its state championship high school basketball team, Dunbar High, in 1993, 2003, and 2006.  The neighborhood's name comes from the fact that it was once the sixth stop without an otherwise identifying landmark on the Northern Texas Traction Co. Interurban electric streetcar system that ran between Fort Worth and Dallas.

Education

Stop Six is part of the Fort Worth ISD and has several public schools. The district operates Dunbar High School, two middle schools, five elementary schools, and one alternative school. Stop Six's Maudrie M. Walton Elementary School was featured in the 2002 PBS documentary A Tale of Two Schools.

Government and infrastructure
The JPS Health Center Stop Six - Walter B. Barbour of the JPS Health Network (Tarrant County Hospital District) is in Stop Six. It includes behavioral and dental services.

Notable residents
 Elmo Henderson (boxer)<ref name="Notheard">"The shot not heard round the world: the way Elmo Henderson tells it, his entire life can be boiled down to a single moment in 1972, when he stepped into the ring in San Antonio and knocked out the greatest fighter on the planet. But honestly, that's just where his story begins." Texas Monthly. December 1, 2004. Retrieved on April 5, 2011.'Texas Monthly.</ref>
Robert Hughes (Coach) Boy's High School Basketball's all-time winningest coach. Hughes led the "Flyin' Wildcats" of Dunbar High School to 30 district titles, 13 state finals appearances, and 3 state championships ('93,'03,'06) during his 32 years ('73-'05) at the school. Hughes was inducted into the Naismith Memorial Basketball Hall of Fame in 2017. He retired with a record of 1,333-262.
Mike Byars (Filmmaker) Once a budding basketball star for Dunbar High School, Byars found worldwide recognition with his debut film "5700 Ramey Ave" A story about legendary basketball coach Robert Hughes who coached him (Byars) at Dunbar. The film's title is the school's address.

See also

List of neighborhoods in Fort Worth, Texas
History of the African Americans in Dallas-Fort Worth

References

External links
Fort Worth Government Stop Six Website
Stop Six Heritage Center at Dunbar 6th 
Old school focus of Stop Six effort." Fort Worth Star-Telegram.
 "Stop Six: A Brief History of a Fort Worth Community." Texas Christian University Magazine''. Spring 2016.
 

Neighborhoods in Fort Worth, Texas